Cyclea barbata is a species of flowering plants that was commonly used as a medicinal plant in Java. It is also used to produce Indonesian typical green grass jelly.

References

barbata
Southeast Asian traditional medicine